The 1954 Arizona State–Flagstaff Lumberjacks football team was an American football team that represented Arizona State College at Flagstaff (now known as Northern Arizona University) in the New Mexico Conference during the 1954 college football season. In their first year under head coach Earl Insley, the Lumberjacks compiled a 3–6 record (1–4 against conference opponents), finished last in the conference, and were outscored by a total of 167 to 130.

The team played its home games at Skidmore Field in Flagstaff, Arizona.

Schedule

References

Arizona State-Flagstaff
Northern Arizona Lumberjacks football seasons
Arizona State-Flagstaff Lumberjacks football